Angeliena is a 2021 South African comedy-drama film directed and written by Uga Carlini. The film stars Euodia Samson, Tshamano Sebe, Thapelo Mokoena, Colin Moss and Kuli Roberts.

Angeliena was released worldwide on Netflix on October 8, 2021.

Premise
In modern day South Africa, colourful Angeliena (Euodia Samson) is a former homeless car guard who is trapped by an unrealistic dream of traveling the world. But when she is diagnosed with a fatal disease, and with a little help from her friends, she dares to put her dream of world travel into motion.

Cast

Awards and nominations

References

External links
 

 Angeliena on Letterboxd.com

2021 films
2021 comedy-drama films
African-American comedy-drama films
2020s English-language films
English-language Netflix original films
English-language South African films
2020s American films